"Chamma Chamma" is a Hindi song from the 1998 Indian film China Gate sung by Alka Yagnik and picturised on Urmila Matondkar which became extremely popular.

Song
It is a classical celebration song or Folk dance song with Filmi Lyrics.

Reception
The song became extremely popular in Indian subcontinent as well as globally.

In popular culture 
It was used in the film Moulin Rouge!. It was incorporated in the film as "Hindi Sad Diamonds".

Remix
It was remastered for the film, Fraud Saiyyan which featured Elli AvrRam and sung by Neha Kakkar.

References

Pop-folk songs
Hindi film songs
1998 songs
Alka Yagnik songs
Shankar Mahadevan songs
Neha Kakkar songs